Ross Richard Yates (born June 18, 1959) is a Canadian former National Hockey League (NHL) player and a former American Hockey League (AHL) head coach.

Biography
As a youth, Yates played in the 1970, 1971 and 1972 Quebec International Pee-Wee Hockey Tournaments with a minor ice hockey team from Mount Royal, Quebec. Yates was an All-Canadian with the Mount Allison University Mounties where he set Canadian college scoring records. He played seven (NHL) games with the Hartford Whalers during the  season. He played in Europe after his NHL years and then entered coaching. He is the former head coach of both the Syracuse Crunch of the AHL and the Saint John Sea Dogs of the QMJHL.

Career statistics

References

External links

1959 births
Living people
Anglophone Quebec people
Binghamton Whalers players
Canadian expatriate ice hockey players in Switzerland
Canadian ice hockey centres
Canadian ice hockey coaches
Detroit Red Wings scouts
EHC Kloten players
Fredericton Express players
Hartford Whalers players
Rochester Americans players
Saint John Sea Dogs coaches
Ice hockey people from Montreal
Undrafted National Hockey League players